Aisa Des Hai Mera may refer to:

 Aisa Des Hai Mera (TV series), a 2006 Indian television drama series
 Aisa Des Hai Mera (song), a song from the film Veer-Zaara